K-292 was a  state highway in the U.S. state of Kansas. K-292's western terminus was at K-92 northeast of the unincorporated community of Springdale and the eastern terminus was at K-92 northeast of Springdale. It served the former Springdale Covered Bridge and was a two-lane road its entire length.

In 1859, the Springdale Covered Bridge was completed over Stranger Creek. In 1926, K-92 was designated as a state highway, which used the covered bridge to cross the river. By 1932, a new steel-concrete bridge was completed slightly north, which K-92 was then realigned onto. The covered bridge remained in use until mid-1943 when it was closed due to breaks in the wooden decking. Due to the historical significance of the bridge, it was added to the state highway system as K-292 in 1945, then was restored in 1946. Early in the morning on September 21, 1958, lightning struck, which burned and destroyed the bridge. Due to the bridge being burned down and the state highway serving no purpose, K-292 was removed from the highway system in a June 22, 1960 resolution.

Route description
K-292 began at K-92 northeast of the unincorporated community of Springdale. It traveled southeastward, on what is now 227th Street, through a forested area along Stranger Creek, a tributary of the Kansas River. K-292 continued past the bridge for a short distance before ending back at K-92.

History

In the mid 1800s, it was noticed that wagon trains coming to and from Fort Leavenworth were slowed down due to having to ford Stranger Creek. On June 12, 1858, the Leavenworth County commissioners appointed surveyors to plan a road between Leavenworth and Ozawkie, which crossed Stranger Creek along the way. On July 12, 1858, the county board appropriated $4,500 for construction of the bridge. On February 9, 1859, an additional $1,500 was appropriated to finish the bridge. In 1859, the Springdale Covered Bridge was completed at a cost of $6,000. In 1926, K-92 was designated as a state highway, which crossed the covered bridge. Three other covered bridges built in Easton, Farmington, and Jarbalo, were removed in the 1930s. In 1936, a grass fire lit the approaches to the covered bridge, but was quickly extinguished. After this incident one  was kept full of water at each end of the bridge. The covered bridge remained in use until May 24, 1943, when it was closed due to breaks in the wooden decking of the bridge.

In a December 12, 1945 resolution, due to the historical significance, it was approved to add the covered bridge and the roadways running to it to the state highway system as K-292. In 1946, the State Highway Commission started a restoration project on the bridge, which included a new roof and siding. On September 21, 1958, at 2 a.m. Central Daylight Time, farmers in the area reported hearing a lightning strike. Around 5:30 a.m., eyewitnesses reported that the bridge collapsed into the creek due to the fire. Due to the bridge being burned down and the state highway serving no purpose, K-292 was removed from the highway system in a June 22, 1960 resolution.

Major intersections

References

External links

Kansas Department of Transportation State Map
KDOT: Historic State Maps

292